Casco Castle was a resort in South Freeport, Maine, United States. Built in 1903, it was intended to resemble a castle. Designed by William R. Miller and overlooking Casco Bay immediately to its east, it burned down in 1914. The tower can be viewed from Harraseeket Road, a few yards closer to the shoreline, or from Winslow Memorial Park, directly to the south across the Harraseeket River. The main part of the building was to the south, with the tower on its northern side, connected by a bridge.

In 1903, Amos F. Gerald, of Fairfield, Maine, built the castle as a resort, with rooms for around one hundred guests, to encourage travel by trolleycars. It was his second attempt; the first, Merrymeeting Park, in Brunswick, Maine, was a failure. The grounds featured a hotel and restaurant, a picnic area, a baseball field, and a small zoo. The hotel burned in 1914, but its stone tower was spared. It stands today on private property. A popular place from which to view the tower is nearby Winslow Memorial Park. 

Trolleycars of the Portland & Brunswick Street Railway, of which Gerald was general manager, brought visitors from nearby Freeport.

Casco Castle Park was served by the Harpswell Steamboat Company, whose steamers stopped in South Freeport en route to and from Portland and Harpswell Center.

The advent of the automobile contributed to the decline of trolley and steamer travel, and the resort closed in 1914 after an eleven-year run. It reopened the same year with new owners, but a fire broke out and destroyed the hotel. The stone tower survived.

A photomechanical print of Casco Castle is in the archives of the Metropolitan Museum of Art in New York City.

Design and construction
The builder of the all-wood hotel was Benjamin Franklin Dunning. He used gray shingles to make the exterior look like stone. A bridge connected the main building to the stone tower.

The designer of the property's gardens was John J. Turner.

References

External links
Photos of Casco Castle Years, chapter 5
Photos of Casco Castle Years, chapter 6

Hotels in Cumberland County, Maine
Castles in the United States
Buildings and structures completed in the 20th century
1903 establishments in Maine
1914 disestablishments in Maine
1914 fires in the United States
Buildings and structures in Freeport, Maine
Demolished buildings and structures in Maine
Buildings and structures demolished in 1914